Gayaza–Ziroobwe Road is a road in central Uganda, connecting the towns of Gayaza in Wakiso District and Ziroobwe in Luweero District.

Location
The coordinates of the road in Bugema, Luweero District are 0°34'14.0"N, 32°38'38.0"E (Latitude:0.570556; Longitude:32.643889).

Overview
Prior to 2007, the road had a gravel surface. In 2007, the government of Uganda began to upgrade the surface to bitumen at an estimated cost of US$40 million. The work, undertaken by Serbian firm Energoprojekt, began in March 2007 and was originally expected to be completed in November 2009. The construction and improvement of the road was extended to include the Kampala-Gayaza section of the road. Because of repeated delays, completion did not occur until June 2011.

Points of interest
The following points of interest also lie along or near the road: (a) the town of Gayaza in Wakiso District, by road, east of Kasangati, (b) Gayaza High School, an all-girls boarding high school established in 1905 (c) Kabanyolo Farm, an agricultural and livestock farm that belongs to the College of Agricultural Sciences and the College of Veterinary Medicine, both at Makerere University, (d) The National Crops Resources Research Institute, located at Namulonge, (e) Bugema University, a private university, maintains its man campus along this road, and (f) in Ziroobwe, this road joins the Ziroobwe–Wobulenzi Road.

See also
 List of roads in Uganda

References

External links
Energoprojekt Road Contracts in Uganda

Roads in Uganda
Wakiso District
Luweero District